The geography of Paris is characterized by the urbanization of the area it lies within, and its position in the Petite Couronne, Grande Couronne, and Île-de-France.

Location 

Paris is located in northern central France. Paris is located in the north-bending arc of the river Seine and includes two islands, the Île Saint-Louis and the larger Île de la Cité, which form the oldest part of the city. The city is spread widely on both banks of the river.

Area 

The city's last major annexation of outlying territories in 1860 not only gave it its modern form but also created the 20 clockwise-spiralling arrondissements (municipal boroughs).

Climate 
 
Paris has a typical Western European oceanic climate (Köppen climate classification: Cfb ) which is affected by the North Atlantic Current. The overall climate throughout the year is mild and moderately wet. Each year, however, there are a few days when the temperature rises above . Longer periods of more intense heat sometimes occur, such as the heat wave of 2003 when temperatures exceeded  for weeks, reached  on some days and seldom cooled down at night. Spring and autumn have, on average, mild days and fresh nights but are changing and unstable. Surprisingly warm or cool weather occurs frequently in both seasons. Light night frosts are however quite common, but the temperature will dip below  for only a few days a year. Snow falls every year, but rarely stays on the ground. The city sometimes sees light snow or flurries with or without accumulation. However the city is known for intermittent abrupt heavy showers. 

Paris has a rich history of meteorological observations, with some going back as far as 1665.

Topography 

It was leveled in the 18th century.
 Belleville:  ASL
 Menilmontant:  ASL
 Buttes-Chaumont:  ASL
 Passy:  ASL
 Chaillot:  ASL
 Montagne Sainte-Geneviève:  ASL
 Butte-aux-Cailles:  ASL
 Montparnasse:  ASL

Paris lies in the so-called "Paris Basin," a low-lying continental shelf region that is occasionally submerged by ocean waters over geologic time, which leaves marine sedimentary deposits behind (e.g., limestone, which was used to construct many of the buildings of the city; this was excavated from an underground quarry called the "Quarries of Paris"). When the region is above sea-level, as at the present time, rivers draining water from the land form, and these cut channels into the landscape. The rivers therefore strongly influence the topography of Paris. The Seine river cuts through Paris, but has apparently meandered in the past within a larger valley whose edges lie on the outskirts of the metropolitan area (the edges of this larger valley are visible from tall buildings in Paris). Many of the "hills" in Paris, appear to be formed as the result of cutoffs from previous meanders in the Seine river, which is now largely channelized to maintain its stability.

Divisions

Arrondissements of Paris 

The city of Paris is divided into twenty arrondissements municipaux, administrative districts, more simply referred to as arrondissements. These are not to be confused with departmental arrondissements, which subdivide the 101 French départements. The word "arrondissement", when applied to Paris, refers almost always to the municipal arrondissements.

The number of the arrondissement is indicated by the last two digits in most Parisian postal codes (75001 up to 75020).

See also 

 Geography of Île-de-France

References

Works cited

External links